Żytkiejmy ; ( until 1936, 1936-38 Schittkehmen, 1938-46 Wehrkirchen) is a village in the administrative district of Gmina Dubeninki, within Gołdap County, Warmian-Masurian Voivodeship, in northern Poland, close to the border with Lithuania and the Kaliningrad Oblast of Russia.

References

Villages in Gołdap County